Deh Now (also Romanized as Deh-e Now; also known as Dehnow Izad Khast) is a village in Dowbaran Rural District, in the Central District of Zarrin Dasht County, Fars Province, Iran. At the 2006 census, its population was 1,940, in 420 families.

References 

Populated places in Zarrin Dasht County